Michel Follet (born 16 December 1959) is a Flemish radio and TV host and a film critic.

Follet started his radio career for VRT as a disc jockey on Radio 2 in 1982. In 1992 Follet co-founded Radio Donna and presented the show Jabbedabbedoe. Between 1994 and 2015 he was film critic for the regional channel ATV in Antwerp.  In 1996 Follet provided the VRT television commentary for the 1996 Eurovision Song Contest (alongside Johan Verstreken) when regular commentator André Vermeulen was unable to make it to Oslo to commentate. In addition Follet has provided the VRT Radio commentary every year since the 1997 Contest and in 1999 he won the Eurovision Song Contest awards.

Currently he host the radio programme: "Michel XXL" on JOE fm alongside Hijlco Span. He currently lives in Mortsel.

References

External links
  Official Website

1959 births
Living people
People from Mortsel
Flemish television presenters
Belgian radio presenters
Belgian film critics